The Haviland House, in Harrison County, Kentucky near Cynthiana, was listed on the National Register of Historic Places in 1983.

It is a four-bay one-and-a-half-story hall-parlor plan dry stone house, built in the early 1800s.  It is said to have been built by a Frenchman who built this and two others in the area for his children.

References

National Register of Historic Places in Harrison County, Kentucky
Federal architecture in Kentucky
Houses in Harrison County, Kentucky
Houses on the National Register of Historic Places in Kentucky
Hall-parlor plan architecture in the United States